Thomas T. Sherman was an early college football player for the Yale Bulldogs, scoring the first points in the team's history. He graduated in 1874.

References

19th-century players of American football
Yale Bulldogs football players